Arapaleeswarar temple, Kolli Malai, also known as Arappalli is a Siva temple in Kolli Hills in Namakkal District in Tamil Nadu (India).

Vaippu Sthalam
It is one of the shrines of the Vaippu Sthalams sung by Tamil Saivite Nayanars Gnanasambandar and Appar.

Presiding deity
The presiding deity is known as Arapaleeswarar. His consort is known as Aram Valartha Nayaki. Once devotees started cooking with the fishes found in the pond of the temple. They got life and jumped into the water. As the presiding deity saved the fishes which were cut he is known as Arapaleeswarar.

Agaya Gangai
Very near to the temple Agaya Gangai is found. The caves of Korakka Siddhar and Kalanginatha Siddhar are found near Agaya Gangai.

References

External links
 Muvar Thevara Vaippu Thalangal, மூவர் தேவார வைப்புத்தலங்கள், அறப்பள்ளி/கொல்லி அறப்பள்ளி/ கொல்லிக்குளிரறைப்பள்ளி/வளப்பூர்நாடு/கொல்லிமலை, aRappaLLi, Sl.No.16 of 139 temples
 Shiva Temples, தேவார வைப்புத்தலங்கள், அறப்பள்ளி, Sl.No.11 of 133 temples, page1

Hindu temples in Namakkal district